Peg Woffington is an 1853 novel by the British author Charles Reade. It was inspired by the popular stage play Masks and Faces which he had co-written with Tom Taylor the previous year. Reade portrayed the London success of the Irish actress Peg Woffington (1720-1760) and featured other prominent figures of the days such as David Garrick.

References

Bibliography
 Sutherland, John. The Longman Companion to Victorian Fiction. Routledge, 2014.

1853 British novels
Novels set in England
Novels by Charles Reade
British novels adapted into films